Branko Ružić (born 14 December 1975) is a Serbian politician serving as  minister of education since 2020. A member of the Socialist Party of Serbia (SPS), he previously served as minister without portfolio in charge of European Integration from 2013 to 2014, as minister of public administration and local self-government from 2017 to 2020, and as first deputy prime minister of Serbia from 2020 to 2022.

Education and career
Ružić was born on 14 December 1975 in Belgrade, Socialist Republic of Serbia, Socialist Federal Republic of Yugoslavia. He spent his childhood in Australia, due to his father's status as a diplomat.

He graduated from the University of Belgrade and served dean student of the faculty from 1996 to 1999. During the time at the University, he joined the Socialist Party of Serbia (SPS).

From April 2000 to December 2002, he was the president of the Youth of the party. He also served as the spokesperson of the party from March 2001 to December 2002. He was an MP in the National Assembly of Serbia from January 2001 to December 2003. From 2004 to 2006 he was an MP in National Assembly of Serbia and Montenegro and several other European Boards.

From 2008 to 2013 he served as the president of position parliamentary group of Socialist Party of Serbia in National Assembly, as well as a member of the permanent delegation of the National Assembly of Serbia to the Parliamentary Assembly of the Council of Europe, where he was a member of the Political Committee and a member of the Human Rights Committee. In September 2013, after the reconstruction of the cabinet of Ivica Dačić, he was named the Minister without portfolio in charge of European integration and stayed on that position until 27 April 2014.

In February 2017, the Prime Minister of Serbia Aleksandar Vučić decided to run for the 2017 Serbian presidential elections. He won the elections in the first round and was sworn as the President of Serbia on 31 May 2017. Weeks later, he gave mandate to Ana Brnabić to form the governmental cabinet. On 29 June 2017, the cabinet of Ana Brnabić was formed, with Ružić being named the Minister of Public Administration and Local Self-Government.

Ružić was named the Minister of Education and the First Deputy Prime Minister of Serbia when the new cabinet is formed on October 28 2020. After the 2022 elections, he stopped being the First Deputy Prime Minister of Serbia, but still remained the Minister of Education.

Political positions 
Earlier in his career, he was as a staunch defender of Slobodan Milošević.

Personal life
Ružić and his wife Ana have two children, son Milutin and daughter Elena.

References

External links
 

1975 births
Living people
People from Zemun
Government ministers of Serbia
Socialist Party of Serbia politicians
FK Partizan non-playing staff
Deputy Prime Ministers of Serbia
Education ministers of Serbia